The Shan State Army – North (abbreviated SSA-N), also known as Shan State Army/Special Region 3 (SSA/SR-3) is a Shan nationalist insurgent group in Myanmar (Burma). It is the armed wing of the Shan State Progress Party (SSPP).

History
The Shan State Army was founded on 24 April 1964 and the Shan State Progress Party was founded in 1971 as the political wing of the SSA. In 1989, the SSPP signed a ceasefire in 1989 after negotiations with the State Peace and Development Council and was able to obtain a degree of autonomy for the areas under its control, establishing the Special Region 3 of the Shan State. This area included Nam Kham, Langkho, Hsipaw, Kyauk Mae, Mong Hsu, Tang Yang, Mongyai, Kehsi and Lashio Township. The size of the armed group at that time was of about 4.000 fighters. Even after having signed a ceasefire, the Burmese military continued to attack the Shan State Army – North areas.

Although the SSA-N is more conciliatory towards the government than other armed Shan separatist groups, in 2005 it abandoned its base rather than disarm. At one point the Burmese government wished the Shan State Army – North to join its border guard force. Two of the three brigades reportedly agreed to join the border guard, while the other refused.

Renewed hostilities
In 2014 the group has clashed with the Burmese army in Kehsi Mansam Township, home to the SSA-N Wanhai headquarters.

Beginning on 6 October 2015 a large scale offensive by the Tatmadaw comprising 20 Burma Army battalions has been launched in central Shan State. The aim of the military is to seize Shan ceasefire territories in Kehsi, Mong Nawng, Mong Hsu and Tangyan townships, using heavy artillery and with fighter jet and helicopter gunship air support to indiscriminately shell and bomb civilian areas. These attacks have displaced thousands of Shan, Palaung, Lisu and Lahu people causing a new humanitarian crisis.

Organisation
The SSA-N originally had three brigades: the 1st, 3rd, and 7th brigades, but two brigades: the 3rd and 7th surrendered in 2009.

See also 
 Internal conflict in Burma
 Shan people

References

External links
 2011.05.21 Shan State Army North & South join forces against Burma Army
 SSA – North loses Mongsu camp to Burma Army
 Shanland

Shan militia groups
Paramilitary organisations based in Myanmar
Politics of Myanmar
1971 establishments in Burma